Wentworth Shire is a local government area in the far south-west Riverina region of New South Wales, Australia. This Shire is located adjacent to the Murray and Darling Rivers. The Shire's major roads are the Sturt and the Silver City Highways.  The Shire includes the towns of Wentworth, Buronga, Gol Gol, Dareton and Pooncarie.

The Mayor of Wentworth Shire Council is Cr. Susan Nichols, an Independent politician.

Heritage listings
Wentworth Shire has a number of heritage-listed sites, including:
Darling River, Polia Station, Pooncarie: PS Rodney
Wentworth, 112 Beverley Street: Wentworth Gaol
Wentworth, 30 Caddell Street: St Ignatius School
Wentworth, Darling Street: St John's Anglican Church, Wentworth
Wentworth, 1122a Low Darling Road: Avoca Homestead Complex

Council 
The area of Wentworth was proclaimed a municipality on 23 January 1879. The first Mayor was Mr. W. Gunn who held office from 1879 to 1880.

Current composition and election method
Wentworth Shire Council is composed of nine councillors elected proportionally as a single ward. All councillors are elected for a fixed four-year term of office. The mayor is elected by the councillors at the first meeting of the council. The most recent election was held on 10 September 2016 and the makeup of the council is as follows:

The current Council, elected in 2016, in order of election, is:

Localities

References

External links
 Wentworth Shire Council home page

 
Local government areas of New South Wales